Amrit Lugun (born 22 November 1962, in Ranchi, Jharkhand) is the Ambassador of India to Greece.

Early life
Lugun's mother-in-law Sushila Kerketta was a Congress MLA and the party candidate from Khunti parliamentary constituency in Jharkhand.

Career
Lugun served as Desk Officer for India Technical and Economic Cooperation Programme in the Ministry of External Affairs from July 1993 to June 1995. He was a Second Secretary, Embassy of India, Doha, Qatar from June 1995 to September 1998. He served as First Secretary at the Embassy of India, Paris, France from October 1998 to December 2001. During his time in Paris, Lugun was accused of beating and sexually abusing Lalita Oraon, his family's live-in servant. The case would cast a shadow on France–India relations. 

After Paris, Lugun was First Secretary at the Embassy of India, Algiers, Algeria from January 2002 to August 2004. At the Ministry of External Affairs from September 2004 to December 2008, he was a Director in the territorial divisions of Eurasia and Latin America. From March 2009 to September 2010 he was posted to the Indian Embassy, Manila. He then served as Director in the SAARC Secretariat in Kathmandu, Nepal. Later he was Ambassador of India to the Republic of Yemen and then Joint Secretary of Consular, Passports and Visas at Ministry of External Affairs.

Lalita Oraon abuse case
While Lugun served as the First Secretary at the Indian Embassy in Paris in 1999, his family's live-in servant, Lalita Oraon, escaped from the household. She was put in the custody of the Committee Against Modern Slavery, an anti-slavery NGO, after being found on Paris streets by police.  Oraon alleged she was beaten, threatened, and sexually abused by her employer. Oroan was examined by medical staff at Hôpital Cochin in Paris. According to a doctor speaking to Le Monde, Oraon had suffered "knife wounds, three to 6cm deep, all around the vagina" and described the injuries as "consistent with an act of torture or deliberate mutilation".

The Indian Ambassador in Paris at the time Kanwal Sibal strongly supported Lugun and in a statement, the Indian Embassy accused the anti-slavery group of "indecent lies" against Lugun and claimed Oraon had suffered cuts to her genitals while jumping off the wall to escape from the convent.

References 

1962 births
Living people
Munda people
People from Ranchi
Prime Minister's Office (India)
Indian Christians
Indian diplomats